Consuelo Moure de Ramírez (1947 – 2 April 2014) was a Colombian actress from Pamplona, Norte de Santander, known for her roles in such films as Nochebuena, Pena máxima, La esquina, Tres hombres y tres mujeres, Es mejor ser rico que pobre, and Champagne.

She ran for the Colombian Senate several times, but was not elected.

Moure died on 2 April 2014 in Bogotá from lung cancer, aged 67.

References

Other websites

1947 births
2014 deaths
Deaths from cancer in Colombia
People from Pamplona, Norte de Santander
Colombian film actresses
Date of birth missing